VIT University may refer to one of several universities in India:

 Vellore Institute of Technology, formerly VIT University, in Tamil Nadu
 VIT-AP University, in Andhra Pradesh
 VIT Bhopal University, in Madhya Pradesh

See also
 VIT (disambiguation)